Arwad, the classical Aradus, is a town in Syria on an eponymous island in the Mediterranean Sea. It is the administrative center of the Arwad Subdistrict (nahiyah), of which it is the only locality. It is the only inhabited island in Syria.

Today, Arwad is mainly a fishing town. According to the Syria Central Bureau of Statistics, during the 2004 census, it had a population of 4,403, predominantly Syrian Sunni Muslims. Plans were unveiled in May 2016 to renovate the island to become a tourist attraction.

Etymology

The original Phoenician city was named Arwad   and was located on an island named. It is mentioned in the Annals of Thutmose III at the Karnak Temple as Irtu. It eventually became known as Arvad, Arpad, and Arphad. These were hellenized as Árados, which was Latinized as Aradus. In Arabic, it became Arwad.

Under the Seleucid Empire, AntiochusI renamed it Antioch after himself or the father of Seleucus the Great.

History

Ancient history

The island was settled in the early 2nd millenniumBC by the Phoenicians. The island was about 800 m long by 500 m wide, surrounded by a massive wall, and an artificial harbor was constructed on the east toward the mainland. It developed into a trading city in early times, as did most of the Phoenician cities on this coast. It had a powerful navy, and its ships are mentioned in the monuments of Egypt and Assyria. In the Bible, an "Arvad" is noted as the forefather of the "Arvadites", a Canaanite people. The Phoenicians collected rain water in cisterns and shipped fresh water to the island, eventually discovering an undersea freshwater spring nearby.

The city of Arwad seems to have had a sort of hegemony over the northern Phoenician cities, from the mouth of the Orontes to the northern limits of Lebanon, something like that of Sidon in the south. It brought under its authority some of the neighboring cities on the mainland, such as Marat (present-day Amrit) and Sumur, the former nearly opposite the island and the latter some kilometers to the south. It had its own local dynasty and coinage, and some of the names of its kings have been recovered.

Egyptian Period 
Thutmose III of Egypt took it in his campaign in north Syria (1472BC), and it is noticed in the campaigns of Ramesses II in the early part of the 13th centuryBC.

It is also mentioned in the Amarna letters as being in league with the Amorites in their attacks on the Egyptian possessions in Syria.

About 1200BC or a little later, it was sacked by invaders from Asia Minor or the islands, as were most of the cities on the coast. but it recovered when they were driven back.

Assyrian Period 
Its maritime importance is indicated by the inscriptions of the Assyrian kings. Tiglath-pileser I (BC) boasts that he sailed in the ships of Arwad. Ashurnasirpal II (BC) made it tributary, but it revolted and 200 men of Arwad were mentioned among the allies of Hadadezer of Aram Damascus at the Battle of Qarqar, when all Syria seems to have been in league against Shalmaneser III. At this time, the king of Arwad was Mattan Baal. It was afterward tributary to Tiglath-pileser III and Sennacherib; under Sennacherib, its king was Abd-Ilihit . Ashurbanipal compelled its king Yakinlu to submit and send one of his daughters to become a member of the royal harem.

Persian Period 
Under the Persians, Arwad was allowed to unite in a confederation with Sidon and Tyre, with a common council at Tripolis. The Book of Ezekiel refers to its seamen and soldiers in the service of Tyre.

Hellenistic Period 
When Alexander the Great invaded Syria in 332BC, Arwad submitted without a struggle under her king Strato, who sent his navy to aid Alexander in the reduction of Tyre. It seems to have received the favor of the Seleucid kings of Syria and enjoyed the right of asylum for political refugees. It is mentioned in a rescript from Rome about 138BC in connection with other cities and rulers of the East, to show favor to the Jews. This was after Rome had begun to interfere in the affairs of Judea and Syria and indicates that Arwad was still of considerable importance at that time.

The city has been cited as one of the first known examples of a republic in the Levant region, in which the people, rather than a monarch, are described as sovereign. The island was important as a base for commercial ventures into the Orontes valley.

Arwad inaugurated a new civic era in 259 BC, when its traditional royalty disappeared, and it became a free independent city within the Seleucid kingdom, during the reign of Antiochus II.

Roman Period 
In Roman times, Arwad fiercely resisted Mark Antony when he came to Syria to find money there. When the city refused to co-operate, it was besieged in 38 BC, then eventually surrendered, which marked the end of its independence in 34–35 BC.

Bishopric 
The city of Aradus, as it was then called, became a Christian bishopric. Athanasius reports that, under Roman Emperor Constantine the Great, Cymatius, the Chalcedonian bishop of Aradus and also of Antaradus (whose names indicate that they were neighbouring towns facing each other) was driven out by the Arians. At the First Council of Constantinople in 381, Mocimus appears as bishop of Aradus. At the time of the Council of Ephesus (431), some sources speak of a Musaeus as bishop of Aradus and Antaradus, while others mention only Aradus or only Antaradus. Alexander was at the Council of Chalcedon in 451 as bishop of Antaradus, Paulus as bishop of Aradus, while, at a synod held at Antioch shortly before, Paulus took part as bishop of both Aradus and Antaradus.

In 458, Atticus signed, as bishop of Aradus, the letter of the bishops of the province of Phoenicia Prima to Byzantine Emperor Leo I the Thracian protesting about the murder of Proterius of Alexandria. Theodorus or Theodosius, who died in 518, is mentioned as bishop of Antaradus in a letter from the bishops of the province regarding Severus of Antioch that was read at a synod held by Patriarch Mennas of Constantinople. The acts of the Second Council of Constantinople in 553 were signed by Asyncretius as bishop of Aradus. At the time of the Crusades, Antaradus, by then called Tartus or Tortosa, was a Latin Church diocese, whose bishop also held the titles of Aradus and Maraclea (perhaps Rachlea).

It was united to the see of Famagusta in Cyprus in 1295. No longer a residential bishopric, Aradus is today listed by the Catholic Church as a titular see.

Medieval history

During the later part of the 13th century, in the time of the Crusades, the island of Ruad was used as a bridgehead or staging area by the Crusaders. It was the last piece of land that the Crusaders maintained in the Holy Land.

The Crusaders had lost control of the mainland in 1291 (see Fall of Acre), and the dwindling Kingdom of Jerusalem had been relocated to the island of Cyprus. In late 1300, in an attempt to coordinate military operations with the Mongol leader Ghazan, the Cypriots prepared a land-based force of approximately 600 men: 300 under Amalric of Lusignan, son of Hugh III of Cyprus, and similar contingents from the Templars and Hospitallers. The men and their horses were ferried from Cyprus to a staging area on Ruad, from which they launched raids on Tortosa while awaiting Mongol reinforcements. When the Mongols failed to arrive, the majority of the Christian forces returned to Cyprus, though a garrison was left on Ruad which was manned by rotating groups of different Cypriot forces. Pope Clement V formally awarded ownership of the island to the Knights Templar, who (in 1302) maintained a garrison with 120 knights, 500 bowmen and 400 Syrian helpers, under the Templar Maréchal (Commander-in-Chief) Barthélemy de Quincy.

In February 1301, the Mongols did arrive with a force of 60,000, but could do little else than engage in some raids around Syria. The Mongol leader Kutluka stationed 20,000 horsemen in the Jordan Valley to protect Damascus, where a Mongol governor was installed. Soon however, they had to withdraw.

The Egyptian Mamluks, who had been systematically re-establishing control over Palestine and Syria, sought to take Ruad as well. A Mamluk fleet landed a force on the island, engaging in combat with the entrenched Templars, and then establishing a lengthy siege, culminating with the Fall of Ruad, and the Crusaders surrendering on September 26, 1302, following a promise of safe conduct. However, the promise was not honored: all the bowmen and Syrian helpers were killed, and the Templar knights were sent to Cairo prisons.

Contemporary era
During WWI, the island was occupied by the French navy on 1 September 1915, under the leadership of Admiral Louis Dartige du Fournet, including warships such as Jauréguiberry, Jeanne d'Arc and Destrées. Later on,  was appointed as its governor. Afterwards, the island was bombed by the Ottomans in November 1917, but their attack was repulsed by French sailors.

In 1945, at the end of WWII, France wanted to preserve the island, hence started working to build a military base, in a geopolitical framework, to maintain a military position in the region, and to keep a cultural influence. But as a result of pressure from the United States, the island was ceded unconditionally to Syria at the end of 1945, a decision confirmed in 1946. 

During the later half of the 20th century and the 21st century, the island's economy became more reliant on tourism, fishing and boatbuilding. This tourism focused economy was greatly impacted by the Syrian Civil War, due to the decreased travel to Syria. However, there has been no conflict on the island during the war, and it has been controlled by government forces since the beginning of the war. The COVID-19 pandemic has also affected the island's economy, further weakening the tourism industry, with many local businesses losing potential tourist related income.

See also
 Arad, Bahrain
 Cities of the ancient Near East
 List of islands of Syria

References and sources

References

Sources
 Malcolm Barber, Trial of the Templars
 Martin Bernal, Black Athena Writes Back (Durham: Duke University Press, 2001), 359.
 Lawrence I Conrad, ‘The Conquest of Arwād: A Source-critical study in the historiography of the early medieval Near East’, in The Byzantine and early Islamic Near East: Papers of the First Workshop on Late Antiquity and Early Islam, edited by Averil Cameron and Lawrence I Conrad, Studies in late antiquity and early Islam, 1, vol. 1, Problems in the literary source material (Princeton: Darwin Press, 1992), 317–401.
 Alain Demurger, The Last Templar
 Hazlitt, The Classical Gazetteer, p. 53.
 Lebling, Robert W. 2016. "Arwad, Fortress at Sea". Aramco World. January February 2016. Volume 67, no. 1. Pages 34–41.
 Newman, Sharan (2006). Real History Behind the Templars. Berkley Publishing Group. .
 Jean Richard, Les Croisades
 Sylvia Schein, "Gesta Dei per Mongolos"
 Dave Eggers, Zeitoun

External links

 L'île d'Arwad, Suggestion to have Arwad recognized as a UNESCO world heritage site, in 1999
 Hazlitt's Classical Gazetteer
 Hundreds of pictures of the island
 Google Earth location
 Small Islands in the Near East
 http://www.tartous-city.com
 Syrian Ministry of Tourism Arwad Regeneration Programme

Populated places in Tartus District
Phoenician cities
Mediterranean islands
Islands of Syria
Hebrew Bible cities
States and territories established in the 2nd millennium BC
Archaeological sites in Tartus Governorate
Populated coastal places in Syria
Towns in Syria
Castles and fortifications of the Knights Templar
Castles and fortifications of the Kingdom of Jerusalem
Former kingdoms
Arwad